The following is a general comparison of BitTorrent clients, which are computer programs designed for peer-to-peer file sharing using the BitTorrent protocol.

The BitTorrent protocol coordinates segmented file transfer among peers connected in a swarm. A BitTorrent client enables a user to exchange data as a peer in one or more swarms. Because BitTorrent is a peer-to-peer communications protocol that does not need a server, the BitTorrent definition of client differs from the conventional meaning expressed in the client–server model.

Bram Cohen, author of the BitTorrent protocol, made the first BitTorrent client, which he also called BitTorrent, and published it in July 2001.

Many BitTorrent programs are open-source software; others are freeware, adware or shareware. Some download managers, such as FlashGet and GetRight, are BitTorrent-ready. Opera 12, a web browser, can also transfer files via BitTorrent.

In 2013 Thunder Networking Technologies publicly revealed that some of their employees surreptitiously distributed a Trojan horse with certain releases of Xunlei, the company's BitTorrent-ready download manager. Xunlei is included in the comparison tables.

Applications

General

Operating system support

Interface and programming

Features I

Features II

Libraries 
 General

 Operating system support and programming language

 Supported features 1

 Supported features 2

See also 
 Anonymous P2P
 BitTorrent tracker
 Comparison of BitTorrent sites
 Comparison of BitTorrent tracker software
 Comparison of file sharing applications
 File sharing
 Open Music Model
 Timeline of file sharing

Notes

References 

BitTorrent
 
BitTorrent clients

it:BitTorrent#Client